Kosatka  is a village in the administrative district of Gmina Brąszewice, within Sieradz County, Łódź Voivodeship, in central Poland.

References

Kosatka
The submarine in the GTA online cayo perico heist has been named after this town.